Orlando David Benítez Mora (born 16 March 1983) is a Colombian politician and economist, current Governor of the Department of Córdoba.

Early life 
Son of the liberal leader Orlando Benítez Palencia, he was born in Valencia, in Córdoba, in 1983. He studied Development Economics at the Universidad Pontificia Bolivariana, specializing in Public Management at the same institution. He also specialized in Government and Public Management at the Pontificia Universidad Javeriana. He completed a master's degree in Government and Public Policy at the Externado de Colombia University, with a double degree from Columbia University in New York. Likewise, he is an Accounting Technician from the CENSA Institute of Montería.

He began his political career in the Liberal Party, in the company of his father, who would be assassinated in 2005 by paramilitaries under the command of "Don Berna", since Benítez Palencia was doing politics in the municipality without authorization from those criminal structures. The crime occurred in the midst of the Peace Process between the Government of Álvaro Uribe and the paramilitaries, which caused the talks to be suspended and "Don Berna" to be captured, who, in 2010, was sentenced to 45 years in prison for the crime.

Governor of Cordoba 

Benítez then decided to participate in the Colombian regional elections of 28 October 2019 by postulating his name for the Governorship of Córdoba Department. In the internal election of the Colombian Liberal Party Verano was the only candidate for what the president of the Liberal party.

As governor of the Department of Córdoba. Benitez has carried out an arduous task against the corruption scandals in which his two predecessors found themselves involved, his loyalty in the department has been one of the greatest in years, becoming qualified as the best governor of the 8 departments of the Caribbean region according to the latest surveys.

In his administration as Governor of Córdoba, a large investment has been made in terms of road infrastructure, with road connectivity being one of his main drivers in his management, as well as his good management in the covid health emergency, with Cordoba being the 10th largest department. affected by the crisis.

References

|-

1983 births
Living people
People from Valencia
Columbia Business School alumni
Colombian businesspeople
Colombian Liberal Party politicians
Pontifical Bolivarian University alumni
Pontifical Xavierian University alumni
Governors of Córdoba Department